The 2019 Florida A&M Rattlers football team represented Florida A&M University as member of the Mid-Eastern Athletic Conference (MEAC) during the 2019 NCAA Division I FCS football season. The Rattlers were led by second-year head coach Willie Simmons and played their home games at Bragg Memorial Stadium. Florida A&M finished the year 9–2 overall and 7–1 in MEAC play to post with the best record in the MEAC and across all HBCU schools. However, in May 2019, Florida A&M had been banned from 2019 postseason play, so could not compete in the Celebration Bowl or for a MEAC championship.

Previous season

The Rattlers finished the 2018 season 6–5, 5–2 in MEAC play to finish in a tie for second place.

Preseason

MEAC poll
In the MEAC preseason poll released on July 26, 2019, the Rattlers were predicted to finish in third place.

Preseason All–MEAC teams
The Rattlers had eleven players selected to the preseason all-MEAC teams.

Second Team Offense

Ryan Stanley – QB

Deshawn Smith – RB

Xavier Smith – WR

Third Team Offense

Bishop Bonnette – RB

Chad Hunter – WR

First Team Defense

Yahia Aly – K

Chris Faddoul – P

Second Team Defense

Terry Jefferson – DB

Third Team Defense

Demontre Moore – DL

Elijah Richardson – LB

Herman Jackson, Jr. – DB

Schedule

Game summaries

at UCF

Fort Valley State

Southern

at Norfolk State

North Carolina Central

at South Carolina State

North Carolina A&T

at Morgan State

Delaware State

Howard

vs. Bethune–Cookman

Ranking movements

References

Florida AandM
Florida A&M Rattlers football seasons
Florida AandM football